Laurel Chor (born 8 January 1990) is a Hong Kong photographer, journalist and filmmaker. She is also a rugby player and competed at the 2017 Women's Rugby World Cup, it was Hong Kong's first-ever World Cup appearance.

Chor graduated from Georgetown University with a Bachelor of Science in International Health and Development and is studying for a Master's degree in Biodiversity, Conservation and Management at Christ Church, Oxford.

References 

1990 births
Living people
Hong Kong people
Hong Kong rugby union players
Hong Kong female rugby union players